Riverbank sedge may refer to:

 Carex emoryi
 Carex stenoptila, native to North America